Qeshlaq (also Romanized as Qeshlāq) is a village in Ojarud-e Gharbi Rural District, in the Central District of Germi County, Ardabil Province, Iran. At the 2006 census, its population was 20, in 6 families.

References 

Tageo

Towns and villages in Germi County